Ritva may refer to: 

 Yom Tov Asevilli, a medieval rabbi and rosh yeshiva of the Yeshiva of Seville (c. 1260 – 1320)
 Ritva, a Finnish and Faroese female given name